Laura Devon (born Mary Louise Briley; May 23, 1931 – July 19, 2007) was an American actress, singer, and model.

Early life
Laura Devon was born May 23, 1931, in Chicago. Her birth name has been given as either Mary Lou Briley or Mary Laura Briley. Her father was identified in the press as Merrill Devon, an automotive engineer, and her mother as Velma Prather.

She attended school in Chicago and Grosse Pointe. She entered Wayne State University, majoring in journalism and political science, where she learned how to act in school theater productions.

In 1954, she gave birth to her only child, Kevin, who became a noted screenwriter. After performing in amateur theatricals and light opera, her first professional part was a lead in a production of The Boy Friend at the Vanguard Playhouse in Detroit.

In 1962, she married Brian Kelly, son of Justice Harry F. Kelly, then a member of the Michigan Supreme Court and a former Michigan governor. Kelly was a fellow actor and, a month after their wedding, he and Devon appeared together on stage in Lillian Hellman's Toys in the Attic at the Laguna Beach Summer Theater. Two years later, he was to become well known for his role as Porter Ricks on the TV series Flipper. They divorced in January 1966.

Screen career and filmography

In 1961, Laura Devon was discovered by Bob Goldstein of 20th Century Fox while she was singing at the London Chop House in Detroit. She tells the story of her coming to Hollywood in this way:

During an eight-year period, from 1960 to 1967, Devon had featured roles in numerous popular TV shows.  A 1962 appearance in Route 66 (S3E1) was her first significant part. Following that, she appeared in:  Insight, The New Breed, The Twilight Zone, Stoney Burke, The Alfred Hitchcock Hour, Rawhide (an episode entitled "Canliss", as Dean Martin's gunfighter character's wife in 1964), Bob Hope Presents the Chrysler Theatre, The Rogues, Bonanza, I Spy, The Fugitive, T.H.E. Cat, The Big Valley, Coronet Blue, and The Invaders.  She had a recurring role on four episodes of Dr. Kildare and she was a member of the repertory cast that rotated major and supporting roles on the critically acclaimed series The Richard Boone Show.

In addition, Devon appeared in five feature-length commercial films, playing Rusty Sartori in Goodbye Charlie (1964), Julie Kazarian in Red Line 7000 (1965), Marie Champlain in Chamber of Horrors (1966), Rosemary in A Covenant with Death (1967) and Edie Hart in Gunn (1967).

Marriage
Devon was married and divorced four times. Her second marriage produced one child, Kevin, born in 1954. Her third husband was actor Brian Kelly, from 1962 to 1966, during which time he was starring in the television series Flipper. In 1967, she married film composer Maurice Jarre and retired from acting. Jarre adopted Devon's then 13-year-old son, giving the future screenwriter and actor his better known name, Kevin Jarre. Devon and Jarre divorced in 1984.

Singing career
Laura Devon released only one professional recording, a single:  "I Like the Look" (A side)/"Dreamsville" (B side). Both songs were composed by Henry Mancini and were featured in the film Gunn, Devon's last film. She can be heard on the soundtrack to the 1975 film Mr. Sycamore, performing the song "Time Goes By", written by her then husband, Maurice Jarre, and lyricist Paul Francis Webster.

Later life and death
Laura Devon died of heart failure in Beverly Hills on July 19, 2007, aged 76.

References

External links

 

1931 births
2007 deaths
American film actresses
Female models from Illinois
American television actresses
Wayne State University alumni
Actresses from Chicago
Actresses from Detroit
20th-century American singers
20th-century American women singers
20th-century American actresses
21st-century American women